Suffolk Coast may refer to:

United Kingdom 
The coast of Suffolk, a county of England

 Suffolk Coast National Nature Reserve, a wetland
 Suffolk Coast Path, a footpath
 Suffolk Coastal (UK Parliament constituency),
 Suffolk Coastal, a local government district which existed between 1974 and 2019
 Suffolk Coast and Heaths, an Area of Outstanding Natural Beauty

United States 

 Suffolk County, New York, a coastal county on Long Island